Chartist is a bi-monthly democratic socialist magazine which has been published in Britain since the 1970s. The magazine is based in London. Its name is inspired by the Chartists, a British democratic movement which existed from 1838–1857.

History and profile
The magazine's editorial policy is firmly aligned with the "democratic socialist left" within the Labour Party, supporting such causes as the Grassroots Alliance slate in Labour National Executive Committee elections and the Save The Labour Party initiative. Its readership and editorial board are not confined, however, to the Labour Party or any one of its factions. This is because it seeks to invite debate with the broader left including greens and various independence movements. It has offered support to Jeremy Corbyn as leader of the Labour party. Chartist defines its policy as being "to promote debate amongst people active in radical politics about the contemporary relevance of democratic socialism across the spectrum of politics, economics, science, philosophy, art, interpersonal relations – in short, the whole realm of social life".

The current editor is Mike Davis. The magazine's production editor and treasurer is Peter Kenyon, and its web editor is Andy Morton.  Other members of the Editorial Board include Duncan Bowie, Peter Chalk, David Floyd, Don Flynn, Roger Gillham, Frank Lee, Dave Lister,  Mary Southcott, James Grayson, Patricia d’Ardenne and Sheila Osmanovic, Robbie Scott, Patrick Mulcahy and Tehmina Kazi.

References

External links
Official website

1970s establishments in the United Kingdom
Bi-monthly magazines published in the United Kingdom
Democratic socialism
Labour Party (UK) publications
Magazines published in London
Magazines with year of establishment missing
Political magazines published in the United Kingdom
Socialist magazines